St. Isidore or Saint-Isidore may refer to:

People
 Isidore of Chios (d. 251), martyr from Roman Egypt
 Isidore of Scété (died c. 390), Egyptian priest and desert ascetic
 Isidore of Pelusium (d. c. 450), monk from Roman Egypt
 Isidore of Seville (c. 560–636), scholar and Archbishop of Seville, Spain
 Isidore the Laborer (c. 1070–1130), peasant and patron saint of Madrid, Spain

Places

Canada
 St. Isidore, Alberta
 St. Isidore, Ontario
 St. Isidore-de-Bellevue, Saskatchewan
 Saint-Isidore, New Brunswick
 Saint-Isidore Parish, New Brunswick
 Saint-Isidore, Montérégie, Quebec
 Saint-Isidore-de-Clifton, Quebec
 Saint-Isidore, Chaudière-Appalaches, Quebec

Elsewhere
 St. Isidore Island, Antarctica
 St Isidore's, Queensland, Australia, a homestead
 St. Isidore Cathedral, Holguín, Cuba
 Saint Isidore Cemetery, Madrid, Spain

See also
 San Isidro (disambiguation)